Între Lacuri (Hungarian: Tóköz; both Romanian and Hungarian name refer to its being located in-between lakes) is a district located in the eastern part of Cluj-Napoca, in Romania. It borders the districts of Gheorgheni and Mărăşti.

Districts of Cluj-Napoca